= Margate Salmestone =

Margate Salmestone was a ward of Margate Municipal District prior to 1973. When the Municipal District was included in the Thanet Borough in 1974, Salmestone ward elected three councillors to the new Borough, but following the boundary changes of 1979 this was reduced to two councillors.

== Elections ==
=== 1973 Election ===
Margate Salmestone ward
Party	Candidate	Votes	%	±%
Labour	D Knott	1,085	%	
Labour	J Lane	1,031	7.7%	
Conservative	W Beerling	1,028	%	
Labour	Mrs M Knott	1,023	7.7%	
Conservative	A Stokes	959	%	
Conservative	K Waddington	902	%	
Majority		62,8,5		
Turnout		2,123	49.3%	4,302

=== 1976 Election ===
Margate Salmestone ward
Party	Candidate	Votes	%	±%
Independent	W Leadbetter (Ratepayers)	788	%	
Independent	M Layton (Ratepayers)	771	%	
Conservative	Frederick Twyman	718	%	
Independent	J Gibson (Ratepayers)	675	42.3%	
Conservative	R Ward	686	%	
Conservative	J Turner	656	%	
Labour	Mrs M Lowe	334	%	
Labour	P Stark	322	%	
Labour	Charles Young	376	%	
Majority		102,85,32		
Turnout		2,124	50.8%	4,181

=== 1979 Election ===
Margate Salmestone ward
Party	Candidate	Votes	%	±%
Independent	W Leadbetter (Ratepayers)	932	%	
Independent	P Coleman	935	%	
Labour	R Ward	881	%	
Conservative	Frederick Twyman	848	%	
Conservative	J Chart	774	%	
Labour	Charles Young	732	%	
Liberal	S Pankhurst	153	%	
Liberal	A Taylor	139	%	
Majority		54,51		
Turnout		2,817	69.8%	4,034

=== 1983 Election ===
Margate Salmestone ward
Party	Candidate	Votes	%	±%
Conservative	Frederick Twyman	630	%	
Labour	Charles Young	620	%	
Conservative	T Purser	547	%	
Labour	Kenneth Fry	518	%	
Liberal	John Sherwell	468	%	
Liberal	Norma Sherwell	441	%	
Majority		83,73		
Turnout		1,718	44.4%	3,867

=== 1987 Election ===
Margate Salmestone ward
Party	Candidate	Votes	%	±%
Conservative	Frederick Twyman	747	%	
Conservative	Gordon Mynard	613	%	
Labour	Charles Young	526	%	
Labour	Kenneth Fry	435	%	
Liberal	John Sherwell	351	%	
Liberal	Norma Sherwell	314	%	
Majority		221,87		
Turnout		1,624	41.6%	3,904

=== 1991 Election ===
3,736 38.5% 1,438

Margate Salmestone ward
Party	Candidate	Votes	%	±%
Labour	Charles Young	656	%	
Labour	Ruzena Derrane	554	%	
Independent	Frederick Twyman	500	%	
Conservative	Cyril Cook	334	%	
Conservative	Gordon Mynard	311	%	
Green	Roalph Reed	118	%	
Majority		156,54		
Turnout		1,428	38.5%	3,726

=== 1995 Election ===
Margate Salmestone ward
Party	Candidate	Votes	%	±%
Labour	Ruzena Derrane	798	%	
Labour	Charles Young	787	%	
Independent	Frederick Twyman	377	%	
Independent	A Brown	234	%	
Conservative	M Brooman	180	%	
Liberal	A Cordell	91	%	
Independent	K Pettitt (NLP)	32	%	
Majority		421,410		
Turnout		1,370	38.1%	3,596

=== 1999 Election ===
3,657 23.3% 852

Margate Salmestone ward
Party	Candidate	Votes	%	±%
Labour	Charles Young	533	%	
Labour	Ruzena Derrane	504	%	
Conservative	Alan Patridge	282	%	
Majority		251,222		
Turnout		852	23.3%	3,657

=== 2003 Election ===
Margate Salmestone ward
Party	Candidate	Votes	%	±%
Labour	Charles Young	411	%	
Conservative	Bowen Fuller	407	%	
Labour	Ruzena Derrane	396	%	
Conservative	Lisa Wright	364	%	
Majority		15,11		
Turnout		858	22.9%	3,743

=== 2007 Election ===
Margate Salmestone ward
Party	Candidate	Votes	%	±%
Labour	Harry Scobie	562	%	
Labour	Ela Lodge-Pritchard	562	%	
Conservative	James Maskell	455	%	
Conservative	Bill Pankhurst	422	%	
Majority		107,107		
Turnout		1,079	28.6%	3,772
